The Little San Bernardino Mountains are a short mountain range of the Transverse Ranges, located in southern California in the United States.

The community of Palm Springs looks north and northeast across the Coachella Valley to the range.

Geography
The range transitions the separation from the Coachella Valley in the Colorado Desert on the south to the Mojave Desert on the north. The range highpoint is Quail Mountain (California), elevation . Other peaks in the range include Mount Inspiration and Eureka Peak.

Habitats
Much of the central and eastern parts of the range are within Joshua Tree National Park. Big Morongo Canyon Preserve is located in the western end of the Little San Bernardino Mountains. The oasis here contains one of the ten largest cottonwood (Populus fremontii) and red willow (Salix laevigata) Riparian zone habitats in California. It was identified as an area of concern by the Bureau of Land Management in 1982. It also has the only native palm to California, Washingtonia filifera, or the Desert fan palm which is now common in artificial landscaping.

Aqueduct
The Colorado River Aqueduct, which provides water for Los Angeles, San Bernardino, and San Diego, runs along the southwest edge of the mountains.

See also
 Cahuilla

References

Mojave Desert index
Transverse Ranges
Mountain ranges of the Mojave Desert
Mountain ranges of the Colorado Desert
San Bernardino Mountains
Mountain ranges of San Bernardino County, California
Mountain ranges of Riverside County, California
Joshua Tree National Park
Protected areas of the Colorado Desert
Protected areas of the Mojave Desert
Protected areas of San Bernardino County, California
Protected areas of Riverside County, California
Mountain ranges of Southern California